Sañjaya Belatthiputra (Sanskrit: Sañjaya Vairatiputra; literally, "Sañjaya of the Belattha clan"), was an Indian ascetic philosopher who lived around the 7th-6th century BC in the region of Magadha. He was contemporaneous with Mahavira, Makkhali Gosala, Ajita Kesakambali and the Buddha, and was a proponent of the ajñana school of thought.

Teacher
Sanjaya is thought to be the first teacher of the future Buddha's future two great disciples, Maha-Moggallana and Sariputta. Both of them were followers of a person named Sanjaya Parabajjaka (Sanjaya the wanderer). Historically, Sanjaya Parabajjaka is considered to be same as Sanjaya Belatthiputta by many scholars. These two future arahants ultimately left Sanjaya's tutelage as it did not address their unresolved desire to end ultimate suffering. Sanjaya Parabajjaka also had a follower named Suppiya, and so was Tattvalabdha, a minister at the court of King Ajatashatru.

Thought
Hecker (1994) contextualizes Sanjaya's thought as "a kind of dialectical existentialism" in juxtaposition to the popular materialist views of the day (for instance, typified by the ascetic teacher Ajita Kesakambalī.)  For example, in the Samannaphala Sutta (DN 2), Sanjaya is recorded as saying:
'If you ask me if there exists another world [after death], if I thought that there exists another world, would I declare that to you? I don't think so. I don't think in that way. I don't think otherwise. I don't think not. I don't think not not. If you asked me if there isn't another world... both is and isn't... neither is nor isn't... if there are beings who transmigrate... if there aren't... both are and aren't... neither are nor aren't... if the Tathagata exists after death... doesn't... both... neither exists nor exists after death, would I declare that to you? I don't think so. I don't think in that way. I don't think otherwise. I don't think not. I don't think not not.'

Commentary
In the Pali literature, Sanjaya's teachings have been characterized as "evasive" or "agnostic". In the Brahmajala Sutta (DN 1), Sanjaya's views are deemed to be amaravikkhepavada, "endless equivocation" or "a theory of eel-wrigglers."

In Jaina literature, Sanjaya is identified as a Jaina sage (Skt., muni).  It is believed that he was influenced by Jaina doctrine although Jaina philosophers were critical of Sanjaya.

See also 
 Ajñana
 Shramana

Notes

Sources 
 Bhaskar, Bhagchandra Jain (1972). Jainism in Buddhist Literature. Alok Prakashan: Nagpur. Available on-line at http://jainfriends.tripod.com/books/jiblcontents.html.
 Hecker, Hellmuth (1994). Maha-Moggallana (BPS Wheel 263). Available on-line at http://www.accesstoinsight.org/lib/authors/hecker/wheel263.html.
 Ñāṇamoli, Bhikkhu (trans.) and Bodhi, Bhikkhu (ed.) (2001). The Middle-Length Discourses of the Buddha: A Translation of the Majjhima Nikāya. Boston: Wisdom Publications. .
 Thanissaro Bhikkhu (trans.) (1997). Samaññaphala Sutta: The Fruits of the Contemplative Life (DN 2). Available on-line at http://www.accesstoinsight.org/tipitaka/dn/dn.02.0.than.html.
 Walshe, Maurice O'Connell (trans.) (1995). The Long Discourses of the Buddha: A Translation of the Dīgha Nikāya. Somerville: Wisdom Publications. .

Year of birth unknown
Year of death unknown
6th-century BC Indian philosophers
6th-century BC Indian monks
Indian agnostics
Skepticism
Spiritual teachers